Wit is a form of intelligent humourthe ability to say or write things that are clever and typically funny. Someone witty is a person who is skilled at making clever and funny remarks. Forms of wit include the quip, repartee, and wisecrack.

Forms
As in the wit of Dorothy Parker's set, the Algonquin Round Table, witty remarks may be intentionally cruel (as in many epigrams), and perhaps more ingenious than funny.

A quip is an observation or saying that has some wit but perhaps descends into sarcasm, or otherwise is short of a point, and a witticism also suggests the diminutive.

Repartee is the wit of the quick answer and capping comment: the snappy comeback and neat retort. (Wilde: "I wish I'd said that." Whistler: "You will, Oscar, you will.")

Metaphysical poetry as a style was prevalent in the time of English playwright William Shakespeare, who admonished pretension with the phrase "Better a witty fool than a foolish wit". It may combine word play with conceptual thinking, as a kind of verbal display requiring attention, without intending to be laugh-out-loud funny; in fact wit can be a thin disguise for more poignant feelings that are being versified. English poet John Donne is the representative of this style.

More generally, one's wits are one's intellectual powers of all types. Native witmeaning the wits with which one is bornis closely synonymous with common sense. To live by one's wits is to be an opportunist, but not always of the scrupulous kind. To have one's wits about one is to be alert and capable of quick reasoning. To be at the end of one's wits ("I'm at my wits' end") is to be immensely frustrated.

See also

Hartford Wits
New Oxford Wits
Oxford Wits
Wit (film)
Wit (play)

References

Bibliography
D. W. Jefferson, "Tristram Shandy and the Tradition of Learned Wit" in Essays in Criticism, 1(1951), 225-49

Humour
Virtue
Word play
Algonquin Round Table